Amphipsalta strepitans, the chirping cicada, is a species of cicada that is endemic to New Zealand. This species was first described by George Willis Kirkaldy in 1909.

References

Cicadas of New Zealand
Endemic fauna of New Zealand
Insects described in 1909
Cicadettini
Taxa named by George Willis Kirkaldy
Endemic insects of New Zealand